Teresa Zimmerman is an American television soap opera writer.

Positions held
The Bold and the Beautiful (hired by William J. Bell)
 Production Personnel (early 1990s)
 Script Writer (1996–2003; January 2008 - April 2008)
 Associate Head Writer (2004–2005)

The Young and the Restless (hired by Maria Arena Bell)
Script Writer (March 2009–present)

Awards and nominations
Daytime Emmy Award
Nomination, 2003, Best Writing, The Bold and the Beautiful
Nomination, 2000, Best Writing, The Bold and the Beautiful

External links

Year of birth missing (living people)
American soap opera writers
Living people
American women television writers
Women soap opera writers
21st-century American women